Robert Phillips (born April 18, 1968) is the George R. Gardiner Professor in Business Ethics and Professor of Strategic Management and Public Policy at the Schulich School of Business; York University. In 2016–17, he was the Gourlay Visiting Professor of Ethics in Business. He has also taught at the University of Richmond, Cheung Kong Graduate School of Business (Shanghai, China), the University of San Diego, the Wharton School at the University of Pennsylvania, and the McDonough School of Business at Georgetown University.

Phillips was born in Asheville, North Carolina, and received a B.S. from Appalachian State University, an M.B.A. from the University of South Carolina, and a Ph.D. from Darden Graduate School of Business Administration at the University of Virginia in 1997. He is known for his work on stakeholder theory and organizational ethics. His published work includes four books (including Stakeholder Theory and Organizational Ethics and The Cambridge Handbook of Stakeholder Theory and dozens of scholarly articles, several of which have been reprinted around the world in multiple languages.  He is a senior fellow at the Olsson Center for Applied Ethics and section editor at Journal of Business Ethics. He was formerly associate editor of Business & Society, Representative-at-Large at the Strategic Management Society, and is past-president of the Society for Business Ethics

References

External links
CSR Video Update: Interview with Robert Phillips, 2010
LOTTERBRAUN im Gespräch mit Robert Phillips - YouTube.com, 2010
Dublin City University lecture on Responsible Banking and Investment

1968 births
Living people
People from Asheville, North Carolina
American business theorists
University of Virginia Darden School of Business alumni
American ethicists
Appalachian State University alumni
University of South Carolina alumni